Mitchell Brookins (December 12, 1960 – July 20, 1993) was an American wide receiver for the Buffalo Bills. He played college football for Illinois. Brookins was drafted in the 4th round of the 1984 NFL Draft by the Bills. He played 21 games and 1 start.

References

External links 
Pro Football Reference page

1960 births
1993 deaths
Buffalo Bills players
American football wide receivers
Illinois Fighting Illini football players